Secunderabad–Manmad is an important railway line connecting the states of Telangana and Maharashtra. It is administered by South Central Railway and was formerly known as Hyderabad–Manmad railway line (built by NGSR) and Godavari Valley railway for some period. , this line is single broad gauged, and electrification is under progress. In March 2023, South Central Railway announced the electrification of an additional 75km on the line (Nizamabad-Kamareddy and Jankampet-Basar)

The major stations on the route are Secunderabad, Kamareddy, Nizamabad, Basar, Mudkhed, Nanded, Parbhani, Jalna, Purna, Aurangabad, Nagarsol and Manmad.

History 
The Nizam of Hyderabad ruled over the Deccan region from the 18th century and under his reign, the railway line between Secunderabad and Manmad was constructed in 1905 by the Nizam's Guaranteed State Railway.

Operations 
The maximum and average operational speed of an express train from Secunderabad Jn. to Manmad Jn.

Intermediate branch lines

Passing trains 
Some of the trains that pass from this line are

See also
 Nizam's Guaranteed State Railway

References 

Rail transport in Maharashtra

5 ft 6 in gauge railways in India
Rail transport in Telangana
Railway lines opened in 1905
 
 
 
Transport in Manmad
1905 establishments in India
Transport in Secunderabad